The  is an incomplete national Expressway in Oshima Subprefecture in Hokkaido that connects central Hakodate to Japan National Route 5 and when completed, the Hokkaido Expressway, in Nanae. It is owned and operated by Ministry of Land, Infrastructure, Transport and Tourism and is signed E5 as an extension of the Hokkaido Expressway.

Route description
The Hakodate Shindō has two lanes in direction from its southern terminus in Hakodate to Nanae-Honchō interchange. The remainder of the road only has one lane in direction.

History
The expressway was opened between the interchanges at Hakodate and Nanae-Honchō on 30 March 2000. The remaining 4.2 km north of Nanae-Honchō was opened on 24 March 2001.

Junction list
The entire expressway is in Hokkaido.

|colspan="8" style="text-align: center;"|Roadway continues as 

References

External links

Expressways in Japan
Roads in Hokkaido
Proposed roads in Japan